Alessandro Di Pardo (born 18 July 1999) is an Italian professional footballer who plays as a midfielder for  club Cagliari, on loan from Juventus.

Early life 
Di Pardo was born in Rimini, Italy, to a father from Campobasso, Italy.

Club career

Juventus U23 
Di Pardo made his Serie C debut for Juventus U23 on 16 September 2018, in a game against Alessandria. Di Pardo's first goal came on 28 September 2020, in a 2–1 win against Pro Sesto.

Juventus 
On 27 January 2021, he made his debut for Juventus, coming on as a substitute in a 4–0 Coppa Italia win over SPAL. Di Pardo's Serie A debut came on 22 February, as a substitute against Crotone in a 3–0 win.

Loans to Vicenza and Cosenza 
On 27 July 2021, Di Pardo moved to Vicenza on loan. On 29 January 2022, he moved on a new loan to Cosenza.

Loan to Cagliari 
On 30 June 2022, Di Pardo joined Cagliari on loan with an option to buy and an obligation to buy conditional on Cagliari's promotion to Serie A.

Honours 
Juventus U23
 Coppa Italia Serie C: 2019–20

Juventus
 Coppa Italia: 2020–21
 Supercoppa Italiana: 2020

References

External links
 

1999 births
Sportspeople from Rimini
Living people
Italian footballers
Italy youth international footballers
Association football midfielders
Rimini F.C. 1912 players
S.P.A.L. players
Juventus F.C. players
Juventus Next Gen players
L.R. Vicenza players
Cosenza Calcio players
Cagliari Calcio players
Serie C players
Serie A players
Serie B players
Footballers from Emilia-Romagna